The Entesa de l'Esquerra de Menorca (EEM) was an electoral alliance formed in Menorca by the Socialist Party of Menorca and Esquerra de Menorca, that lasted from 1987 to 1994.

Member parties
Socialist Party of Menorca (PSM)
Left of Menorca (EM)

Electoral performance

Parliament of the Balearic Islands

References

Political parties in the Balearic Islands
Defunct political party alliances in Spain
Political parties established in 1987
Political parties disestablished in 1994